Bawlf (Blackwells) Airport  is an airport located in Camrose County, in central Alberta, Canada, near Bawlf.

The airport is noted for being popular among model airplane enthusiasts, hosting the annual airshow on the Canada Day weekend, and the Corn Roast in mid August.

The airport has three grass runways, the main runway being west-east, with the two smaller running northwest and northeast.

References

External links
Page about this airport on COPA's Places to Fly airport directory

Registered aerodromes in Alberta
Camrose County